Cemilli Castle (also called Kaleburnu Castle) is a medieval castle (or an observation tower) in the rural area of Mersin in southern Turkey.

Geography
It is situated to the east of Cemilli  village and to the west of Mersin. It overlooks the village and the road connecting Mersin to Fındıkpınarı.

Building
Both Cemilli and Kaleburnu are Turkish names. The original name of the castle is not known. It is a small medieval age castle. It was built probably to control the road to north. Presently most of the building has been demolished. There are cracked pieces of ceramic coating from the Byzantine, Seljuk and Ottoman eras around the castle.

References

Castles in Mersin Province
Ruined castles in Turkey
Archaeological sites in Mersin Province, Turkey
Mezitli District